Riwaka is a small settlement in the Tasman District of New Zealand's South Island. It lies beside Tasman Bay / Te Tai-o-Aorere, five kilometres north of Motueka, and close to the mouth of the Riuwaka River. The land where the town is based was a swamp known as Tureauraki. Europeans first settled in Riwaka in May 1842. The Riwaka economy has been based around growing tobacco and hops.

Etymology
The settlement's name, Riwaka, is a corruption of the Māori name Riuwaka, which derives from riu meaning bilge or interior, and waka meaning canoe. The name can be interpreted as the hull of the canoe. 

The name of the nearby river was officially altered from Riwaka River to Riuwaka River in August 2014, following the Treaty of Waitangi settlements between the Crown and local iwi Ngāti Rārua and Te Atiawa o Te Waka-a-Māui.

Demographics

Riwaka

It had a population of 765 at the 2018 New Zealand census, an increase of 108 people (16.4%) since the 2013 census, and an increase of 135 people (21.4%) since the 2006 census. There were 270 households. There were 396 males and 372 females, giving a sex ratio of 1.06 males per female, with 168 people (22.0%) aged under 15 years, 117 (15.3%) aged 15 to 29, 366 (47.8%) aged 30 to 64, and 111 (14.5%) aged 65 or older.

Ethnicities were 92.5% European/Pākehā, 14.1% Māori, 1.6% Pacific peoples, 2.0% Asian, and 2.7% other ethnicities (totals add to more than 100% since people could identify with multiple ethnicities).

Although some people objected to giving their religion, 66.3% had no religion, 21.2% were Christian, 0.4% were Hindu, 0.4% were Buddhist and 3.5% had other religions.

Of those at least 15 years old, 96 (16.1%) people had a bachelor or higher degree, and 114 (19.1%) people had no formal qualifications. The employment status of those at least 15 was that 333 (55.8%) people were employed full-time, 96 (16.1%) were part-time, and 12 (2.0%) were unemployed.

Kaiteriteri-Riwaka statistical area

Kaiteriteri-Riwaka had a population of 1,761 at the 2018 New Zealand census, an increase of 222 people (14.4%) since the 2013 census, and an increase of 297 people (20.3%) since the 2006 census. There were 591 households. There were 915 males and 846 females, giving a sex ratio of 1.08 males per female. The median age was 44.5 years (compared with 37.4 years nationally), with 297 people (16.9%) aged under 15 years, 273 (15.5%) aged 15 to 29, 888 (50.4%) aged 30 to 64, and 306 (17.4%) aged 65 or older.

Ethnicities were 90.5% European/Pākehā, 10.4% Māori, 4.9% Pacific peoples, 1.4% Asian, and 2.7% other ethnicities (totals add to more than 100% since people could identify with multiple ethnicities).

The proportion of people born overseas was 23.7%, compared with 27.1% nationally.

Although some people objected to giving their religion, 62.5% had no religion, 26.1% were Christian, 0.2% were Hindu, 0.5% were Buddhist and 3.4% had other religions.

Of those at least 15 years old, 240 (16.4%) people had a bachelor or higher degree, and 258 (17.6%) people had no formal qualifications. The median income was $29,000, compared with $31,800 nationally. The employment status of those at least 15 was that 747 (51.0%) people were employed full-time, 279 (19.1%) were part-time, and 36 (2.5%) were unemployed.

Church 

The Saint Barnabas Anglican church is located on Main Road, Riwaka.

Education

The school, opened in 1848, is one of the oldest schools in New Zealand.

References

Populated places in the Tasman District
Populated places around Tasman Bay / Te Tai-o-Aorere